The Sony Ericsson C905 is a high-end mobile phone in Sony's 'C' (Cyber-shot) range, which,  along with the low-end 'S' (Snapshot) range cameras, supplants the earlier 'K' range of camera phones. It is the flagship model in Sony Ericsson's range for 2008 and it was released on 22 October 2008. It's the first 8-megapixel camera phone to be released outside Korea, while adding the Assisted GPS (A-GPS) and Wi-Fi function. It is also the first Sony Ericsson mobile phone to support the DLNA sharing network and is the first Cyber-shot phone to also be released for AT&T.

Features

Screen
2.4", 240×320 pixels (QVGA), 262,144 (18-bit) color TFT LCD

Camera
8.1 megapixel CMOS (3264×2448, 7.99 effective megapixels)
Autofocus lens
Xenon flash, 3-LED videolight, focus assist lamp, self-portrait mirror
Image stabilizer
Face detection auto focus up to 3 faces
Smile Shutter (newly added, users can update it using the update service option)
Auto Rotate
BestPic
16× digital zoom
Video recording: QVGA (320×240) @30fps
Dedicated camera still/record/review key
Dual Function D-Pad
Mechanical lens cover
PhotoAlbum
PictBridge

Connectivity
Blog link
GPS with A-GPS, with picture geotagging support
WLAN 802.11b/g, DLNA technology
NetFront 4.5 web browser with Autorotate
Microsoft Exchange ActiveSync
Apple iSync supported via a free plugin  from Sony Ericsson
Bluetooth

Audio
Media player 3.0 with MegaBass (simplified version of Walkman 3.0)
M4A/MP3/MIDI ringtones
FM Radio with RDS
Shazam TrackID application to identify music
PlayNow 5.0

Memory
160MB internal
2GB M2 included, up to 8GB max. (Sandisk has tested that the biggest memory card size possible on the C905 is 16GB.)

Design
Four colours: 'Copper Gold', 'Ice Silver', 'Night Black' and 'Tender Rose'

Startup failures, data corruption and hardware issues
For some users, the C905 can suddenly fail to startup, and instead just show a black screen with the backlight turning on and off repeatedly  .

This problem happens due to internal data corruption (caused by the phone), and can only be fixed by restoring the phone to its original software/firmware — meaning that all personal data will be erased. On some occasions, this problem can be fixed by using the Update Service software that comes on the CD (or from Sony Ericsson's website). However, personal data will still be erased.

Users are recommended to regularly backup their data using both a Memory Stick — for photos and contacts — and using the software MyPhoneExplorer to back up other data to a PC. A startup failure can be predicted when the text message menu can no longer be opened.

A hardware fault that has been reported frequently is that the earpiece speaker on the slider-screen will quit working due to a fragile connector. This can sometimes be temporarily 'fixed' by depressing and holding the 'c' button on the right side; or by using the speakerphone option.  Sony will repair this at no cost (except shipping) if the phone is still in warranty. Vodafone staff claim this is the reason they have stopped selling the phone new.

See also
Samsung i8510 Innov8
Samsung M8800 Pixon
LG Renoir
Nokia N82
Sony Ericsson K850i

References

https://www.mobilestech.in/2019/08/How-to-find-my-phone-using-Google.html==External links==
 Sony Ericsson press release 
 Official C905 specifications 
 Official C905 specifications for developers
 Press photos of C905
 

C905
Mobile phones introduced in 2008
Sony Ericsson C905